The list of ship decommissionings in 1969 includes a chronological list of all ships decommissioned in 1969.


See also 

1969
 Ship decommissionings
Ship